Little Earthquakes is the debut solo album by the American singer-songwriter Tori Amos, featuring the singles "Silent All These Years", "China", "Winter" and "Crucify". After Atlantic Records rejected the first version of the album, Amos began working on a second version with her then-boyfriend Eric Rosse. The album was first released in the UK on January 6, 1992, where it peaked at number 14 in the charts.

It was well received by critics and listeners. In the US, the album reached the top 60 of the Billboard 200.  It is frequently regarded as one of the greatest albums of all time; it was voted number 73 in Colin Larkin's All Time Top 1000 Albums 3rd Edition (2000) and ranked number 233 on Rolling Stone's 500 greatest albums of all time.

Recording 
Following the dissolution of her synth-pop band Y Kant Tori Read, Amos composed 12 songs, recorded them at Capitol Studios in Los Angeles with Davitt Sigerson producing, and in June 1990 submitted them for copyright.

Amos approached Atlantic Records in December 1990 with a 10-track demo tape, some being newer songs but mostly ones from June. The track listing consisted of "Russia" (later to become "Take to the Sky"), "Mary", "Crucify", "Happy Phantom", "Leather", "Winter", "Sweet Dreams", "Song for Eric", "Learn to Fly" and "Flying Dutchman". Atlantic was unhappy with the songs, and in response Amos and her then boyfriend Eric Rosse recorded some new songs, including "Girl", "Precious Things", "Tear in Your Hand", "Mother" and "Little Earthquakes". The song "Take Me with You" was recorded during these sessions, but not released until 2006 (with re-recorded vocals.) This session was recorded on a limited budget in Rosse's home studio, using his 3M 24-track analog tape machine and a Yamaha CP-80 piano. Amos and Rosse also went to Stag Studios to use a Yamaha grand piano. Satisfied with these recordings, Atlantic determined that the album Little Earthquakes would have 13 tracks, removing "Learn to Fly" and adding four from the December recording session.

Amos moved to London to work with Ian Stanley (formerly of Tears for Fears); Atlantic thought Amos would have an easier time of achieving success in the United Kingdom, because of that market's appreciation for eccentric performers. Here she recorded what would become two of her early singles. "Me and a Gun" was the last song written for the album, while "China" was an early track, originally titled "Distance", that she wrote in 1987.

The second final version of the album was accepted by the record company. However, this was still revised before the final release; a 13-track promo cassette shows that the song "Little Earthquakes" was to appear after "Happy Phantom" on side one, with side two closing with "Flying Dutchman". The latter track was presumably dropped due to the physical restraints of the vinyl LP format.

Atlantic's European counterpart, East West, promoted the record extensively. Amos spent much of 1991 performing in small bars and clubs in London and playing for music executives and journalists, often in her own apartment. The Me and a Gun EP containing four tracks was released in October 1991, receiving considerable critical attention. The single was re-issued the following month with "Silent All These Years" as the lead composition, and it became her first chart entry at UK number 51 following Single of the Week support from BBC Radio 1 and a TV debut on the high-rated chat show of Jonathan Ross on Channel 4. The back cover of the album contains pictures of Phallus impudicus mushrooms, also known as stinkhorns.

Release 
When the album was finally released in the UK in January 1992, it reached number 14 and remained on the Top 75 charts (UK Albums Chart) for 23 weeks. A month later, it was released in the United States to breakthrough critical success and also announced itself as a chart mainstay, despite peaking outside the Top 50 on the Billboard 200. The accompanying singles (along with "Me and a Gun" and "Silent All These Years") were "China" (January 1992 UK), "Winter" (March 1992 UK/November 1992 US) and "Crucify" (May 1992 US/June 1992 UK), the US EP version of which featured covers of songs by artists including The Rolling Stones and Nirvana.

Critical reception 

Reviews of the album were generally positive. Josef Woodward of Rolling Stone wrote that "Amos shares common ground with artfolk songstresses like Kate Bush and Jane Siberry" and described her "quivery vibrato-laden holler – akin to Siouxsie Sioux's".  The song "Leather" was pictured as a "Kurt Weill-meets-Queen cabaret act". He described the album as "an often pretty, subtly progressive song cycle that reflects darkly on sexual alienation and personal struggles", and that by the end of the album "we feel as though we've been through some peculiar therapy session, half-cleansed and half-stirred. That artful paradox is part of what makes Little Earthquakes a gripping debut." His original rating of three and a half stars out of five in the 1992 print version of the magazine was later rounded up to four stars out of five on Rolling Stones website. Jean Rosenbluth of the Los Angeles Times wrote that few had "progressed from the silly to the sublime as quickly or smoothly as Amos" and praised Little Earthquakes as "a quixotic, compelling record that mixes the smart sensuality of Kate Bush with the provocative impenetrability of Mary Margaret O'Hara." Among negative assessments, Stephanie Zacharek of Entertainment Weekly felt that Amos's songs "are too self-consciously weird" to be enjoyable, while Village Voice critic Robert Christgau only expressed praise for the song "Me and a Gun", disregarding the rest as lesser versions of Kate Bush.

In the United Kingdom, where Amos was first promoted, the album was also warmly received. Jon Wilde of Melody Maker stated that Amos "possesses a rare ability to explore a multiplicity of emotions and a broad range of perspectives within the same song", describing the album's songs as "cerebral soul music for the kind of people who mean to read TE Lawrence's Seven Pillars of Wisdom on their holiday but end up spending all their time exchanging bodily fluids with strangers." Qs John Aizlewood wrote that "Guilt, misery and failed relationships thread their way through Little Earthquakes with occasional detours for childhood traumas transformed into adult inadequacies" and praised Amos' lyrics, concluding: "Little Earthquakes is disturbing, funny and sexy by turns. Amos does all this with the unmistakable stamp of a potentially great songwriter. Where on earth can she go from here?" Roger Morton of NME, however, was more reserved, writing that "it isn't easy getting to grips with Tori" and calling Little Earthquakes "a sprawling, confusing journey through the gunk of a woman's soul ... Sometimes it's magical and sometimes it's sickly and overwrought."

Legacy 
In 1998, Q readers voted Little Earthquakes the 66th greatest album of all time, and in 2002 the same magazine named it the fourth Greatest Album of All-Time by a Female Artist. In a retrospective review of the album, AllMusic critic Steve Huey stated that with Little Earthquakes, Amos "carved the template for the female singer/songwriter movement of the '90s" and that while "her subsequent albums were often very strong, Amos would never bare her soul quite so directly (or comprehensibly) as she did here, nor with such consistently focused results." Slant Magazines Sal Cinquemani cited it as Amos's most focused and accessible recording, which "almost immediately sparked cult interest in the singer, and has, over time, undoubtedly become a soundtrack (at least in part) to the lives of many anguished teens and adults." Little Earthquakes was included in the book 1001 Albums You Must Hear Before You Die.
In 2000 it was voted number 73 in Colin Larkin's All Time Top 1000 Albums. In 2020 Rolling Stone ranked the album at number 233 on its "500 Greatest Albums of All Time" list.

Reviewing the 2015 remastered edition of the album, J.C. Maçek III of Spectrum Culture wrote: "With its lack of standard rock and pop clichés of the day and reliance on acoustic piano and an excellent (if unconventional) voice, Little Earthquakes sounds as unique today as it did in 1992." Rolling Stones Jessica Machado stated that "nearly 25 years later, the album's emotional highs and lows seem even more impressive for a debut." Mojos Jenny Bulley praised Little Earthquakes as a "remarkable, idiosyncratic" debut revealing "a singular creative force from the outset", while PopMatterss Alex Ramon stated that it "immediately demonstrates her ability to go right to the heart of an emotional experience and powerfully communicate it through a variety of musical styles." Barry Walters of Pitchfork cited Little Earthquakes and its follow-up Under the Pink as Amos' "milestones" and wrote that "the legacy of these milestones linger over today's underground", citing a number of acts who "all wear their sensitivities as strengths as she did."

In a roundtable interview with The Hollywood Reporter, singer Justin Timberlake expressed his immense admiration for Little Earthquakes. Timberlake said, "That album changed my life. So [expletive] good."

Track listing

Reissues and commemorations

In 2015, Little Earthquakes received a deluxe edition which including a bonus disc consisting of B-sides and previously unreleased live tracks. Additionally, in 2022, a graphic novelization of the album's songs and its B-sides was released.

2015 deluxe edition track listing

Personnel 

Tori Amos – acoustic and electric pianos and lead vocals , background vocals , sampled strings 
Steve Caton – guitar , bass , background vocals 
John Chamberlain – mandolin 
Paulinho da Costa – percussion 
Jake Freeze – rat pedal , saw 
Stuart Gordon – violin 
Ed Greene – drums 
Will Gregory – oboe 
Tina Gullickson – background vocals 
Chris Hughes – drums 
David Lord – string arrangement 
Will McGregor – bass 
Carlo Nuccio – drums 
Philly – finger cymbal 
David Rhodes – guitar 
Eric Rosse – drum and keyboard programming , background vocals , Irish war drum 
Jef Scott – bass 
Matthew Seligman – bass 
Nancy Shanks – background vocals 
Phil Shenale – keyboard programming 
Eric Williams – ukulele , dulcimer 
Orchestra arranged and conducted by Nick DeCaro

Charts

Certifications

References 

Atlantic Records albums
Tori Amos albums
1992 debut albums
Albums produced by Eric Rosse
Albums produced by Ian Stanley
Albums recorded at Capitol Studios